Chinkani (chinka a type of water plant, Aymara -ni a suffix to indicate ownership, "the one with the chinka plant", also spelled Chincani) is a mountain east of the Apolobamba mountain range in the Andes of Bolivia, about  high. It is located in the La Paz Department, Franz Tamayo Province, Pelechuco Municipality. Chinkani lies northeast of the mountain Allqamarini and east of Q'umir Pata at a small lake and river named Quchapata (Khochapata).

References 

Mountains of La Paz Department (Bolivia)